A. S. Rugge House is a historic home located at Glens Falls, Warren County, New York.  It was built about 1880 and is a -story, gable-roofed brick Italianate style residence.  It features 1-story side and entrance porches with turned posts and paneled balustrades.

It was added to the National Register of Historic Places in 1984.

See also
 National Register of Historic Places listings in Warren County, New York

References

Houses on the National Register of Historic Places in New York (state)
Italianate architecture in New York (state)
Houses completed in 1880
Houses in Warren County, New York
National Register of Historic Places in Warren County, New York